The Australian Domestic One-Day Cricket Final is the last match in the domestic List A Limited overs cricket series in Australia. The competition has had many names since its inception, since 2019–20 it is known as the Marsh One-Day Cup.

Under the current competition format, the final is played at the home ground of the team that finishes the regular competition in first place. Under previous competition formats, the final has been played at the home ground of the finalist with the best record in the competition to that point or, in the very early years, at a neutral venue.

Vehicle & General Australasian Knock-out Competition

1970-71: Queensland v Western Australia at Melbourne – 6 February 1971
Western Australia 170 (John Inverarity 90, Tony Dell 2-18) (38.2 ov)
Queensland 79 (Phil Carlson 23, Graham McKenzie 4-13) (23.5 ov)
Western Australia won by 91 runs
Player of the Match: John Inverarity (WA)
Crowd 5,595

Coca-Cola Australasian Knock-out Competition

1971-72: South Australia v Victoria at Adelaide – 6 February 1972
South Australia 190 (Ian Chappell 82, Greg Chappell 59, Jim Higgs 3-25, Robert Rowan 3-35) (38.7 ov)
Victoria 2-192 (Bill Lawry 108, Keith Stackpole 52, Jeff Hammond 1-41) (33.4 ov)
Victoria won by 8 wickets
Player of the Match: Bill Lawry (Vic)
Crowd 9,189
1972-73: Queensland v New Zealand at Brisbane – 21 January 1973
New Zealand 9-170 (Bevan Congdon 75, Geoff Dymock 2-18) (35 ov)
Queensland 132 (Phil Carlson 33, Bob Cunis 3-15, David O'Sullivan 3-29) (31.3 ov)
New Zealand won by 38 runs
Player of the Match: Bevan Congdon (NZ)
Crowd 7,049

Gillette Cup

1973-74: New Zealand v Western Australia at Melbourne – 3 February 1974
New Zealand 150 (John Morrison 50, Graham McKenzie 3-20, Wayne Clark 3-38) (36.3 ov)
Western Australia 3-151 (Wally Edwards 54, Bevan Congdon 2-31) (26.6 ov)
Western Australia won by 7 wickets
Player of the Match: Graham McKenzie (WA)
1974-75: New Zealand v Western Australia at Melbourne – 2 February 1975
Western Australia 76 (Rob Langer 40, Richard Collinge 4-20, Ewen Chatfield 3-5) (26.1 ov)
New Zealand 2-77 (Bevan Congdon 40*, Dennis Lillee 2-27) (17 ov)
New Zealand won by 8 wickets
Player of the Match: Richard Collinge (NZ)
Crowd 4,462
1975-76: Western Australia v Queensland at Perth – 8 February 1976
Queensland 7-236 (Greg Chappell 61, Martin Kent 61, Dennis Lillee 3-41) (40 ov)
Western Australia 232 (Ian Brayshaw 52, Dennis Lillee 32 (20), Greg Chappell 3-38) (39 ov)
Queensland won by 4 runs
Player of the Match: Greg Chappell (Qld)
Crowd 11,134
1976-77: Victoria v Western Australia at Melbourne – 23 January 1977
Victoria 164 (Paul Hibbert 38, Dennis Lillee 2-30, Mick Malone 2-34) (37.3 ov)
Western Australia 9-165 (Mick Malone 47*, Alan Hurst 3-31) (39.3 ov)
Western Australia won by 1 wicket
Player of the Match: Mick Malone (WA)
Crowd 32,908
1977-78: Western Australia v Tasmania at Perth – 5 February 1978
Tasmania 9-184 (Roger Woolley 56, Terry Alderman 4-40, John Inverarity 3-19) (40 ov)
Western Australia 3-185 (Graeme Wood 108*, Jack Simmons 1-33) (37.1 ov)
Western Australia won by 7 wickets
Player of the Match: Graeme Wood (WA)
Crowd 13,753
1978-79: Tasmania v Western Australia at TCA Ground, Hobart – 14 January 1979
Tasmania 6-180 (Jack Simmons 55*, Trevor Docking 46*, Graeme Porter 2-29) (50 ov)
Western Australia 133 (Craig Serjeant 47, Jack Simmons 4-17, Anthony Benneworth 3-14) (45 ov)
Tasmania won by 47 runs
Player of the Match: Jack Simmons (Tas)
Crowd 10,822

McDonald's Cup

1979-80: Victoria v New South Wales at Melbourne – 25 November 1979
New South Wales 8-198 (Doug Walters 59*, Shaun Graf 2-34) (50 ov)
Victoria 6-199 (Julien Wiener 64, Graeme Beard 2-36) (47.4 OV)
Victoria won by 4 wickets
Player of the Match: Julien Wiener (Vic)
Crowd 20,604
1980-81: Queensland v Western Australia at Brisbane – 22 February 1981
Queensland 9-188 (Kepler Wessels 53, Martin Kent 41, Dennis Baker 2-37) (48 ov)
Western Australia 116 (Craig Serjeant 28, Carl Rackemann 2-11) (32.5 ov)
Queensland won by 72 runs
Player of the Match: Martin Kent (Qld)
Crowd 20,043
1981-82: New South Wales v Queensland at Sydney – 7 March 1982
Queensland 8-224 (Wayne Broad 85, Geoff Lawson 2-33) (47 ov)
New South Wales 197 (Peter Toohey 66, Geoff Dymock 5-27) (44.4 ov)
Queensland won by 27 runs
Player of the Match: Wayne Broad (Qld)
Crowd 5,549
1982-83: Western Australia v New South Wales at Perth – 20 March 1983
Match abandoned without a ball bowled
1982-83 Replay: Western Australia v New South Wales at Perth – 8 October 1983
New South Wales 6-195 (Dirk Wellham 65*, David Boyd 2-29) (50 ov)
Western Australia 6-198 (Kim Hughes 61, Greg Shipperd 54, Geoff Lawson 2-27) (49.1 ov)
Western Australia won by 4 wickets
Crowd 9,179
1983-84: South Australia v Western Australia at Adelaide – 4 March 1984
South Australia 6-256 (Don O'Connor 96*, Ken MacLeay 2-25) (49 ov)
Western Australia 9-248 (Rod Marsh 54, Ian Carmichael 4-50) (49 ov)
South Australia won by 8 runs
Player of the Match: Don O'Connor (SA)
1984-85: New South Wales v South Australia at Sydney – 16 February 1985
New South Wales 7-278 (John Dyson 79, Peter Clifford 69, Dirk Wellham 51, Wayne Prior 3-53) (50 ov)
South Australia 190 (Michael Haysman 44, Greg Matthews 3-29) (45.5 ov)
New South Wales won by 88 runs
Player of the Match: Dirk Wellham (NSW)
Crowd 11,782
1985-86: Victoria v Western Australia at Melbourne – 9 March 1986
Western Australia 2-129 (Mike Veletta 67*) (26.2 ov); Victoria Did not bat
Match Abandoned
Crowd 9,370
1985-86 Replay: Victoria v Western Australia at Melbourne – 10 March 1986
Western Australia 167 (Wayne Andrews 71, Denis Hickey 5-26) (38 ov)
Victoria 148 (Dav Whatmore 34, Graeme Porter 3-28) (36.5 ov)
Western Australia won by 19 runs
Player of the Match: Denis Hickey (Vic)
Crowd 3,065
1986-87: Tasmania v South Australia at TCA Ground, Hobart – 15 March 1987
South Australia 6-325 (Glenn Bishop 116, Wayne B. Phillips 75 (43), Allister de Winter 3-84) (50 ov)
Tasmania 9-239 (Danny Buckingham 56, Tim May 3-50) (50 ov)
South Australia won by 86 runs
Player of the Match: Glenn Bishop (SA)
1987-88: New South Wales v South Australia at Sydney – 27 March 1988
New South Wales 7-219 (Trevor Bayliss 44, Darryl Scott 3-41) (50 ov)
South Australia 6-196 (Peter Sleep 48*, Steve Waugh 2-37) (50 ov)
New South Wales won by 23 runs
Player of the Match: Graham Smith (NSW)
Crowd 6,180

FAI Cup

1988-89: Victoria v Queensland at Melbourne – 19 March 1989
Queensland 4-253 (Allan Border 77* (56), Greg Ritchie 60, Merv Hughes 1-49) (50 ov)
Victoria 90 (Damien Fleming 18*, Carl Rackemann 3–9, Dirk Tazelaar 3-18, John Maguire 3-30) (32.4 ov)
Queensland won by 163 runs
Player of the Match: Allan Border (Qld)
1989-90: Western Australia v South Australia at Perth – 31 March 1990
South Australia 87 (Michael Bevan 23*, Terry Alderman 4-14) (34.5 ov)
Western Australia 3-88 (Geoff Marsh 29*, Colin Miller 2-42) (19.1 ov)
Western Australia won by 7 wickets
Player of the Match: Terry Alderman (WA)
Crowd 11,675
1990-91: Western Australia v New South Wales at Perth – 27 October 1990
New South Wales 7-235 (Michael Bevan 74*, Bruce Reid 2-34) (50 ov)
Western Australia 3-236 (Geoff Marsh 91*, Mike Veletta 61*, Mark McPhee 58, Mark Waugh 1-26) (44.5 ov)
Western Australia won by 7 wickets
Player of the Match: Geoff Marsh (WA)
Crowd 11,294
1991-92: Western Australia v New South Wales at Perth – 26 October 1991
New South Wales 9-199 (Mark Taylor 50, Bruce Reid 3-35) (50 ov)
Western Australia 130 (Damien Martyn 54, Wayne Holdsworth 2-14) (40.1 ov)
New South Wales won by 69 runs
Player of the Match: Mark Taylor (NSW)
Crowd 10,825

Mercantile Mutual Cup

1992-93: New South Wales v Victoria at Sydney – 20 February 1993
Victoria 186 (Paul Nobes 41, Brad McNamara 3-27) (50 ov)
New South Wales 6-187 (Michael Bevan 64*, Michael Slater 54, Darren Lehmann 1-26)
New South Wales won by 4 wickets
Player of the Match: Brad McNamara (NSW)
Crowd 11,070
1993-94: New South Wales v Western Australia at Sydney – 12 March 1994
New South Wales 4-264 (Richard Chee Quee 131, Michael Bevan 77, Damien Martyn 2-31) (50 ov)
Western Australia 9-218 (Justin Langer 65, Tim Zoehrer 61 (48), Brad McNamara 2-39) (49 ov)
New South Wales won by 43 runs (revised target)
Player of the Match: Richard Chee Quee (NSW)
Player of the Series: Stuart Law (Qld)
Crowd 6,136
1994-95: Victoria v South Australia at Melbourne – 5 March 1995
South Australia 169 (Darren Webber 47, Jason Bakker 4-15, Troy Corbett 4-30) (46.4 ov)
Victoria 6-170 (Matthew Elliott 46*, Joe Scuderi 3-36) (44.5 ov)
Victoria won by 4 wickets
Player of the Match: Troy Corbett (Vic)
Crowd 11,167
1995-96: Queensland v Western Australia at Brisbane – 3 March 1996
Western Australia 166 (Tom Moody 40, Geoff Foley 3-34, Scott Prestwidge 3-39) (49.1 ov)
Queensland 6-167 (Trevor Barsby 50, Brendon Julian 3-46) (44.5 ov)
Queensland won by 4 wickets
Player of the Match: Trevor Barsby (Qld)
Crowd 8,597
1996-97: Western Australia v Queensland at Perth – 2 March 1997
Queensland 148 (Geoff Foley 34*, Mark Atkinson 3-33) (40.1 ov)
Western Australia 2-149 (Ryan Campbell 50 (45), Scott Prestwidge 1-16) (35 ov)
Western Australia won by 8 wickets
Player of the Match: Ryan Campbell (WA)
Crowd 13,399
1997-98: New South Wales v Queensland at Sydney – 1 March 1998
New South Wales 166 (Phil Emery 38, Andy Bichel 3-25, Scott Prestwidge 3-25) (49.3 ov)
Queensland 8-167 (Scott Prestwidge 42*, Shane Lee 2-27) (47.5 ov)
Queensland won by 2 wickets
Player of the Match: Scott Prestwidge (Qld)
Crowd 11,164
1998-99: Victoria v New South Wales at Melbourne – 28 February 1999
Victoria 231 (Ian Harvey 57 (54), Mark Higgs 2-33) (50 ov)
New South Wales 192 (Michael Bevan 55, Paul Reiffel 2-30) (45.3 ov)
Victoria won by 39 runs
Player of the Match: Ian Harvey (Vic)
Player of the Series: Matthew Hayden (Qld)
1999-2000: Western Australia v Queensland at Perth – 27 February 2000
Western Australia 6-301 (Ryan Campbell 108 (85), Simon Katich 43, Michael Kasprowicz 2-59) (50 ov)
Queensland 256 (Jimmy Maher 102 (90), Martin Love 73, Jo Angel 3-49) (45.2 ov)
Western Australia won by 45 runs
Player of the Match: Brad Hogg (WA)
Player of the Series: Matthew Hayden (Qld)
Crowd 11,893
2000-01: Western Australia v New South Wales at Perth – 25 February 2001
Western Australia 7-272 (Mike Hussey 84* (68), Tom Moody 78, Shane Lee 2-39) (50 ov)
New South Wales 4-276 (Michael Bevan 135* (137), Michael Clarke 57, Duncan Spencer 2-57) (48.2 ov)
New South Wales won by 6 wickets
Player of the Match: Michael Bevan (NSW)
Players of the Series: Darren Lehmann (SA) and Sean Young (Tas)

ING Cup

2001-02: Queensland v New South Wales at Brisbane – 24 February 2002
New South Wales 204 (Brad Haddin 45, Nathan Hauritz 4-47, James Hopes 3-33) (50 ov)
Queensland 185 (Martin Love 53, Shawn Bradstreet 4-23, Dominic Thornely 3-36) (48.5 ov)
New South Wales won by 19 runs
Player of the Match: Dominic Thornely (NSW)
Player of the Series: Darren Lehmann (SA)
Crowd 12,005
2002-03: Western Australia v New South Wales at Perth – 23 February 2003
Western Australia 207 (Peter Worthington 49*, Stuart Clark 3-34) (49.5 ov)
New South Wales 3-211 (Steve Waugh 88 (55), Simon Katich 75*, Brad Williams 3-55) (26.5 ov)
New South Wales won by 7 wickets
Player of the Match: Stuart Clark (NSW)
Player of the Series: Justin Langer (WA)
2003-04: Queensland v Western Australia at Brisbane – 29 February 2004
Queensland 244 (Clinton Perren 57, Stuart Law 50, Kade Harvey 4-28) (49.1 ov)
Western Australia 6-248 (Scott Meuleman 71, Kade Harvey 53* (42), Nathan Hauritz 2-55) (49.4 ov)
Western Australia won by 4 wickets
Player of the Match: Kade Harvey (WA)
Player of the Series: Brad Hodge (Vic)
Crowd 13,092
2004-05: Queensland v Tasmania at Brisbane – 20 February 2005
Queensland 7-246 (Jimmy Maher 104, Craig Philipson 56, Adam Griffith 2-37) (50 ov)
Tasmania 3-247 (Daniel Marsh 67*, Michael Dighton 57, Ashley Noffke 1-47) (47.1 ov)
Tasmania won by 7 wickets
Player of the Match: Jimmy Maher (Qld)
Player of the Series: James Hopes (Qld)
Crowd 12,357
2005–06: South Australia v New South Wales at Adelaide – 26 February 2006
South Australia 154 (Mark Cosgrove 49, Aaron Bird 3-30) (43.5 ov)
New South Wales 9-155 (Corey Richards 35, Shaun Tait 6-41) (40.4 ov)
New South Wales won by 1 wicket
Player of the Match: Shaun Tait (SA)
Player of the Series: Mark Cosgrove (SA)
Crowd 8,404

Ford Ranger Cup

2006–07: Victoria v Queensland at Melbourne - 25 February 2007
Queensland 5-274 (Jimmy Maher 108, Clinton Perren 75, Darren Pattinson 2-49) (50 ov)
Victoria 9-253 (Andrew McDonald 65*, David Hussey 62, Aaron Nye 3-55) (50 ov)
Queensland won by 21 runs
Player of the Match: Jimmy Maher (Qld)
Player of the Series: Matthew Elliott (SA)
Crowd c. 5,000
2007–08: Tasmania v Victoria at Hobart - 23 February 2008
Victoria 158 (David Hussey 50, Andrew McDonald 35, Xavier Doherty 4-18) (37.3 ov)
Tasmania 9-132 (Travis Birt 38, Dane Anderson 25, Bryce McGain 3-11) (30.1 ov)
Tasmania won by 1 wicket (D-L Method)
Player of the Match: Brett Geeves (Tas)
Player of the Series: Matthew Elliott (SA)
Crowd 5,063
2008–09: Queensland v Victoria at Melbourne - 22 February 2009.
Queensland 8-187 (Chris Hartley 49*, Glen Batticciotto 40, Shane Harwood 2-23, Damien Wright 2-31) (50 ov)
Victoria 175 (Rob Quiney 52, Adam Crosthwaite 29, Nathan Rimmington 4-40, Ben Laughlin 3-25) (48 ov)
Queensland won by 12 runs
Player of the Match: Nathan Rimmington (Qld)
Player of the Series: Shane Harwood (Vic)
2009–10: Victoria v Tasmania at Melbourne - 28 February 2010.
Tasmania 6-304 (Tim Paine 100, Michael Dighton 80, Ed Cowan 61, Andrew McDonald 3-60, John Hastings 2-67) (50 ov)
Victoria 194 (Andrew McDonald 64, Matthew Wade 40, Gerard Denton 5-45, Xavier Doherty 2-43) (42.1 ov)
Tasmania won by 110 runs
Player of the Match: Tim Paine (Tas)
Player of the Series: Brad Hodge (Vic)
Crowd: 3,296

Ryobi Cup

Matador BBQs One-Day Cup

JLT One-Day Cup

Marsh One-Day Cup

References
Inline

Others

 Cricinfo - Ford Ranger One Day Cup, 2006-07
 Cricket Australia - Ford Ranger One Day Cup, 2006-07
 Cricinfo – 1969-70 V & G Australasian Knock-Out Competition Final
 Cricinfo - 1970-71 V & G Australasian Knock-Out Competition Final
 Cricinfo – 1971-72 Coca-Cola Australasian Knock-Out Competition
 Cricinfo – 1972-73 Coca-Cola Australasian Knock-Out Competition
 Cricinfo – 1973-74 Gillette Cup
 Cricinfo – 1974-75 Gillette Cup
 Cricinfo – 1975-76 Gillette Cup
 Cricinfo – 1976-77 Gillette Cup
 Cricinfo – 1977-78 Gillette Cup
 Cricinfo – 1978-79 Gillette Cup
 Cricinfo – 1979-80 McDonald’s Cup Final
 Cricinfo – 1980-81 McDonald’s Cup Final
 Cricinfo – 1981-82 McDonald’s Cup Final
 Cricinfo – 1982-83 McDonald’s Cup Final
 Cricinfo – 1982-83 McDonald’s Cup Final Replay
 Cricinfo – 1983-84 McDonald’s Cup Final
 Cricinfo – 1984-85 McDonald’s Cup Final
 Cricinfo – 1985-86 McDonald’s Cup Final
 Cricinfo – 1985-86 McDonald’s Cup Final Replay
 Cricinfo - 1986-87 McDonald’s Cup Final
 Cricinfo - 1987-88 McDonald’s Cup Final
 Cricinfo - 1988-89 FAI Cup Final
 Cricinfo - 1989-90 FAI Cup Final
 Cricinfo – 1990-91 FAI Cup Final
 Cricinfo – 1991-92 FAI Cup Final
 Cricinfo – 1992-93 Mercantile Mutual Cup Final
 Cricinfo – 1993-94 Mercantile Mutual Cup Final
 Cricinfo – 1994-95 Mercantile Mutual Cup Final
 Cricinfo – 1995-96 Mercantile Mutual Cup Final
 Cricinfo – 1996-97 Mercantile Mutual Cup Final
 Cricinfo – 1997-98 Mercantile Mutual Cup Final
 Cricinfo – 1998-99 Mercantile Mutual Cup Final
 Cricinfo – 1999-2000 Mercantile Mutual Cup Final
 Cricinfo – 2000-01 Mercantile Mutual Cup Final
 Cricinfo – 2001-02 ING Cup Final
 Cricinfo – 2002-03 ING Cup Final
 Cricinfo – 2003-04 ING Cup Final
 Cricinfo – 2004-05 ING Cup Final
 Cricinfo – 2005-06 ING Cup Final
 Cricinfo - 2006-07 Ford Ranger Cup Final
 Cricinfo - 2007-08 Ford Ranger Cup Final

Australian domestic cricket competitions
List A cricket competitions